Martin Garcia Island Airport  is the airport of Isla Martín García, a small Argentine island at the head of the Río de la Plata estuary, near the coast of Uruguay.

It features a small passenger terminal and a single long asphalt runway. Daily traffic consists of general aviation private and commercial (tourism) flights, especially on weekends.

Touch-and-go's are not allowed (strictly enforced) due to noise abatement restrictions to protect the birds nesting in the wildlife preserve next to the airport.

History 
The island was under jurisdiction of the Argentine Navy since 1886, and naval forces were placed in it. In the late 1920s an airstrip was built, the precursor of the Martín García Naval Air Station (Spanish: Estación Aeronaval Martín García); this was expanded in the 1950s to support heavier aircraft. The air station become the "Martín García Island Airport" after jurisdiction was transferred to the Province of Buenos Aires.

Facilities 
All approach and departures are over the water. North approach and departure are over a noise-sensitive nature preserve. The immediate area around the island is Argentine airspace.

See also

Transport in Argentina
List of airports in Argentina

References

External links
OpenStreetMap - Martin Garcia Airport
OurAirports - Isla Martin Garcia Airport

Airports in Argentina